Ons Jabeur defeated Jessica Pegula in the final, 7–5, 0–6, 6–2 to win the women's singles tennis title at the 2022 Madrid Open. It was her first WTA 1000 title, and she became the first Arab and African woman to win a WTA 1000 title.

Aryna Sabalenka was the defending champion, but lost in the first round to Amanda Anisimova.

Simona Halep's loss in the quarterfinals guaranteed a maiden WTA 1000 finalist from the bottom half of the draw as well as a first-time champion at the Madrid Open.

This marked the last professional appearance for Olympic champion Monica Puig; she lost to Danielle Collins in the first round.

Seeds

Draw

Finals

Top half

Section 1

Section 2

Bottom half

Section 3

Section 4

Seeded players
The following are the seeded players based on the entry list as of 25 April 2022. Rankings and points before are as of 25 April 2022.

† The player did not qualify for the tournament in 2021. Accordingly, points from her 16th best tournament will be deducted instead.

Withdrawn players
The following players would have been seeded, but withdrew before the tournament began.

† The player is not required to count zero points from this mandatory tournament due to a long-term injury exemption.

Other entry information

Wildcards

Source:

Protected ranking
  Karolína Muchová

Qualifiers

Lucky losers

Withdrawals

Qualifying

Seeds

Qualifiers

Lucky losers

Qualifying draw

First qualifier

Second qualifier

Third qualifier

Fourth qualifier

Fifth qualifier

Sixth qualifier

Seventh qualifier

Eighth qualifier

Ninth qualifier

Tenth qualifier

Eleventh qualifier

Twelfth qualifier

References

External links 
 Main draw
 Qualifying draw

Mutua Madrid Open - Women's singles
Singles women